The Turpan-Hami oil fields or the Tuha oil fields are the oil fields found in Turpan and Hami of Xinjiang Uyghur Autonomous Region, China. They are one of Xinjiang's three largest oil fields, the other two being Jungar and Tarim.

The Turpan-Hami oild field are managed by PetroChina's Tuha subsidiary. Their oil refinery is done in Turpan.

See also
Tuha Station (吐哈站) on Lanzhou–Xinjiang high-speed railway
West–East Gas Pipeline

References

External links

Oil fields in China
Geography of Xinjiang
Turpan
Hami